Acharei Mot (also Aharei Mot, Aharei Moth, or Acharei Mos) (Hebrew for "after the death") is the 29th weekly Torah portion in the annual Jewish cycle of Torah reading. It is the sixth weekly portion (parashah) in the Book of Leviticus, containing . It is named after the fifth and sixth Hebrew words of the parashah, its first distinctive words.

The parashah sets forth the law of the Yom Kippur ritual, centralized offerings, blood, and sexual practices. The parashah is made up of 4,294 Hebrew letters, 1,170 Hebrew words, 80 verses, and 154 lines in a Torah Scroll (Sefer Torah).

Jews generally read it in April or early May. The lunisolar Hebrew calendar contains up to 55 weeks, the exact number varying between 50 in common years and 54 or 55 in leap years. In leap years (for example, 2022, 2024, and 2027), parashah Acharei Mot is read separately on the 29th Sabbath after Simchat Torah. In common years (for example, 2021, 2023, 2025, 2026, and 2028), parashah Acharei Mot is combined with the next parashah, Kedoshim, to help achieve the needed number of weekly readings.

Traditional Jews also read parts of the parashah as Torah readings for Yom Kippur.

Readings

First reading — Leviticus 16:1–17
The first reading begins the ritual of Yom Kippur. After the death of Aaron's sons, God told Moses to tell Aaron not to come at will into the Most Holy Place (Kodesh Ha-Kodashim), lest he die, for God appeared in the cloud there. Aaron was to enter only after bathing in water, dressing in his sacral linen tunic, breeches, sash, and turban, and bringing a bull for a sin offering, two rams for burnt offerings, and two he-goats for sin offerings. Aaron was to take the two goats to the entrance of the Tabernacle and place lots upon them, one marked for the Lord and the other for Azazel. Aaron was to offer the goat designated for the Lord as a sin offering, and to send off to the wilderness the goat designated for Azazel. Aaron was then to offer the bull of sin offering. Aaron was then to take a pan of glowing coals from the altar and two handfuls of incense and put the incense on the fire before the Most Holy Place, so that the cloud from the incense would screen the Ark of the Covenant. He was to sprinkle some of the bull's blood and then some of the goat's blood over and in front of the Ark, to purge the Shrine of the uncleanness and transgression of the Israelites.

Second reading — Leviticus 16:18–24
In the second reading (aliyah), Aaron was then to apply some of the bull's blood and goat's blood to the altar, to cleanse and consecrate it. Aaron was then to lay his hands on the head of the live goat, confess over it the Israelites' sins, putting them on the head of the goat, and then through a designated man send it off to the wilderness to carry their sins to an inaccessible region. Then Aaron was to go into the Tabernacle, take off his linen vestments, bathe in water, put on his vestments, and then offer the burnt offerings.

Third reading — Leviticus 16:25–34
In the third reading (aliyah), Aaron was to offer the fat of the sin-offering. The person who set the Azazel-goat (sometimes referred to in English as a scapegoat) free was to wash his clothes and bathe in water. The bull and goat of sin offering were to be taken outside the camp and burned, and he who burned them was to wash his clothes and bathe in water. The text then commands this law for all time: On the tenth day of the seventh month, Jews and aliens who reside with them were to practice self-denial and do no work. On that day, the High Priest was to put on the linen vestments, purge the Tabernacle, and make atonement for the Israelites once a year.

Fourth reading — Leviticus 17:1–7
The fourth reading (aliyah) begins what scholars call the Holiness Code. God prohibited Israelites from slaughtering oxen, sheep, or goats meant for sacrifice without bringing them to the Tabernacle as an offering.

Fifth reading — Leviticus 17:8–18:5
In the fifth reading (aliyah), God threatened excision (karet) for Israelites who slaughtered oxen, sheep, or goats meant for sacrifice without bringing them to the Tabernacle as an offering. God prohibited consuming blood. One who hunted an animal for food was to pour out its blood and cover it with earth. Anyone who ate what had died or had been torn by beasts was to wash his clothes, bathe in water, and remain unclean until evening. God told the Israelites not to follow the practices of the Egyptians or the Canaanites, but to follow God's laws.

Sixth reading — Leviticus 18:6–21
In the sixth reading (aliyah), God prohibited any Israelite from uncovering the nakedness of his father, mother, father's wife, sister, grandchild, half-sister, aunt, daughter-in-law, or sister-in-law. A man could not marry a woman and her daughter, a woman and her granddaughter, or a woman and her sister during the other's lifetime. A man could not cohabit with a woman during her period or with his neighbor's wife. Israelites were not to allow their children to be offered up to Molech.

Seventh reading — Leviticus 18:22–30
In the seventh reading (aliyah), God prohibited a man from lying with another man as with a woman. God prohibited bestiality. God explained that the Canaanites defiled themselves by adopting these practices, and any who did any of these things would be cut off from their people.

In ancient parallels
The parashah has parallels in these ancient sources:

Leviticus chapter 16
The tablets describe that to prepare for her wedding to the king, the woman hung the necklace of her old life around the neck of a goat and drove it into the hills of Alini, "Where it may stay forever."

In inner-biblical interpretation
The parashah has parallels or is discussed in these Biblical sources:

Leviticus chapter 16

Yom Kippur
 refers to the Festival of Yom Kippur. In the Hebrew Bible, Yom Kippur is called:
the Day of Atonement (Yom HaKippurim) or a Day of Atonement (Yom Kippurim);
a Sabbath of solemn rest (Shabbat Shabbaton); and
a holy convocation (mikrah kodesh).

Much as Yom Kippur, on the 10th of the month of Tishrei, precedes the Festival of Sukkot, on the 15th of the month of Tishrei,  speaks of a period starting on the 10th of the month of Nisan preparatory to the Festival of Passover, on the 15th of the month of Nisan.

Similarly,  and  call it a "Sabbath of solemn rest." And  and  institute the observance as "a statute forever."

 sets out detailed procedures for the priest's atonement ritual during the time of the Temple.

, 16, and 30–34 each summarize this purpose of Yom Kippur. Similarly,  foreshadows this purpose in the description of the altar, and  echoes that purpose in its listing of the Festivals.

In , chance determined which goat was to be offered and which goat was to be sent into the wilderness.  teaches that when lots are cast, God determines the result.

 instructs that after seven Sabbatical years, on the Jubilee year, on the day of atonement, the Israelites were to proclaim liberty throughout the land with the blast of the horn and return every man to his possession and to his family.

In , the Haftarah for Yom Kippur morning, God describes "the fast that I have chosen [on] the day for a man to afflict his soul."  make clear that "to afflict the soul" was understood as fasting.

Leviticus chapter 17
, like , addresses the centralization of sacrifices and the permissibility of eating meat. While  prohibited killing an ox, lamb, or goat (each a sacrificial animal) without bringing it to the door of the Tabernacle as an offering to God,  allows killing and eating meat in any place.

In early nonrabbinic interpretation
The parashah has parallels or is discussed in these early nonrabbinic sources:

Leviticus chapter 16
The book of Jubilees taught that it was ordained that the children of Israel should afflict themselves on the tenth day of the seventh month because that was the day that the news came to Jacob that made him weep for the loss of his son Joseph. His descendants thus made atonement for themselves with a young goat, for Joseph's brothers had slaughtered a kid and dipped the coat of Joseph in the blood, and sent it to Jacob on that day.

Philo taught that Moses proclaimed the fast of Yom Kippur a feast and named it the greatest of feasts, "a Sabbath of Sabbaths," for many reasons. First is temperance, for when people have learned how to be indifferent to food and drink, they can easily disregard superfluous things. Second is that everyone thereby devotes their entire time to nothing else but prayers and supplications. And third is that the fast occurs at the conclusion of harvest time, to teach people not to rely solely on the food that they have accumulated as the cause of health or life, but on God, Who rules in the world and Who nourished our ancestors in the desert for 40 years.

Leviticus chapter 17
Professor Isaiah Gafni of Hebrew University of Jerusalem noted that in the Book of Tobit, the protagonist Tobit observed the dietary laws.

Leviticus chapter 18
Professor Lawrence Schiffman of New York University noted that this was a point of contention between the Pharisees and other Jewish groups in Second Temple times.

In classical rabbinic interpretation
The parashah is discussed in these rabbinic sources from the era of the Mishnah and the Talmud:

Leviticus chapter 16
Rabbi Levi taught that God gave  on the day that the Israelites set up the Tabernacle. The Gemara reported that Rabbi Johanan interpreted , "Take this book of the law," to refer to the time after the Torah had been joined together from its several parts. And the Gemara suggested that Resh Lakish interpreted , "in a roll of the book written of me," to indicate that the whole Torah is called a "roll," as  says, "And he said to me, 'What do you see?' And I answered, 'I see a flying roll.'" Or perhaps, the Gemara suggested, it is called "roll" for the reason given by Rabbi Levi, who said that God gave eight sections of the Torah, which Moses then wrote on separate rolls, on the day on which the Tabernacle was set up.

Rabbi Yannai taught that from the very beginning of the world’s creation, God foresaw the deeds of the righteous and the wicked, and provided Yom Kippur in response. And , “one day,” teaches that God gave the righteous one day — Yom Kippur.

Similarly, Rabbi Judah bar Simon interpreted , “And God called the light day,” to symbolize Jacob/Israel; “and the darkness he called night,” to symbolize Esau; “and there was evening,” to symbolize Esau; “and there was morning,” to symbolize Jacob.  And “one day” teaches that God gave Israel one unique day over which darkness has no influence — the Day of Atonement.

Rabbi Hiyya bar Abba taught that Aaron's sons died on the first of Nisan, but  mentions their death in connection with the Day of Atonement. Rabbi Hiyya explained that this teaches that as the Day of Atonement effects atonement, so the death of the righteous effects atonement. And we learn that the death of the righteous effects atonement from 2 Samuel , which says, "And they buried the bones of Saul and Jonathan his son," and then says, "After that God was entreated for the land."

This teaches that God grieved for Nadab and Abihu, for they were dear to God. And thus  quotes God to say: "Through them who are near to Me I will be sanctified."

For other reasons for their death, see, for example:  Leviticus Rabbah 20:8, in, e.g., Midrash Rabbah: Leviticus, translated by Harry Freedman and Maurice Simon, volume 4, page 259. (for offering a sacrifice that they had not been commanded to offer, for the strange fire that they brought, or for not having taken counsel from each other). Babylonian Talmud Eruvin 63a, in, e.g., Koren Talmud Bavli: Eiruvin • Part Two, commentary by Adin Even-Israel (Steinsaltz), volume 5, page 63. Jerusalem: Koren Publishers, 2013. (because they gave a legal decision in the presence of their Master Moses). Sifra Shemini Mekhilta deMiluim 99:5:6. (because they gave a legal decision in the presence of their Master Moses). Sifra Shemini Mekhilta deMiluim 99:3:4 (because they had remarked to each other how Moses and Aaron would die and they would head the congregation).</ref>

Once a Sadducee High Priest arranged the incense outside and then brought it inside the Holy of Holies. As he left the Holy, he was very glad. His father met him and told him that although they were Sadducees, they were afraid of the Pharisees. (The Sadducees interpreted  as if it said: "Let him not come into the holy place except with the cloud of incense, for only thus, with the cloud, am I to be seen on the Ark-cover.") The Sadducee wondered when the opportunity would come for him to fulfill the verse. He asked how, when such an opportunity came to his hand, he could not have fulfilled it. The Baraita reported that only a few days later he died and was thrown on the dung heap and worms came forth from his nose. Some say he was smitten as he came out of the Holy of Holies. For Rabbi Hiyya taught that a noise was heard in the Temple Court, for an angel struck him down on his face. The priests found a mark like a calf's hoof on his shoulder, evincing, as  reports of angels, "And their feet were straight feet, and the sole of their feet was like the sole of a calf's foot."

The Mishnah taught that during the days of the Temple, seven days before Yom Kippur, they would move the High Priest from his house to the cell of the counselors and prepare another priest to take his place in case anything impure happened to him to make him unfit to perform the service. Rabbi Judah said that they prepared another wife for him, in case his wife should die, as  says that "he shall make atonement for himself and for his house" and "his house" means "his wife." But they told Rabbi Judah that if they would do so, then there would be no end to the matter, as they would have to prepare a third wife in case the second died, and so on. The rest of the year, the High Priest would offer sacrifices only if he wanted to, but during the seven days before Yom Kippur, he would sprinkle the blood of the sacrifices, burn the incense, trim the lamps, and offer the head and the hind leg of the sacrifices. They brought sages from the court to the High Priest, and throughout the seven days they read to him about the order of the service. They asked the High Priest to read it aloud, in case he had forgotten or never learned.

The Mishnah taught that on the morning of the day before Yom Kippur, they placed the High Priest at the Eastern Gate and brought before him oxen, rams, and sheep, so that he could become familiar with the service. The rest of the seven days, they did not withhold food or drink from him, but near nightfall on the eve of Yom Kippur, they would not let him eat much, as food might make him sleep. The sages of the court took him up to the house of Avtinas and handed him over to the elders of the priesthood. As the sages of the court took their leave, they cautioned him that he was the messenger of the court, and adjured him in God's Name that he not change anything in the service from what they had told him. He and they turned aside and wept that they should have to suspect him of doing so.

The Mishnah taught that on the night before Yom Kippur, if the High Priest was a sage, he would expound the relevant Scriptures, and if he was not a sage, the disciples of the sages would expound before him. If he was used to reading the Scriptures, he would read, and if he was not, they would read before him. They would read from Job, Ezra, and Chronicles, and Zechariah ben Kubetal said from Daniel. If he tried to sleep, young priests would snap their middle finger before him and say, "Mr. High Priest, arise and drive the sleep away!" They would keep him busy until near the time for the morning offering.

On any other day, a priest would remove the ashes from the altar at about the time of the cock's crow (in accordance with ). But for Yom Kippur, the ashes were removed beginning at midnight of the night before. Before the cock's crow approached, Israelites filled the Temple Court. The officer told the priests to see whether the time for the morning sacrifice had arrived. If it had, then the priest who saw it would call out, "It's daylight!"

They led the High Priest down to the place of immersion (the mikveh). During the day of Yom Kippur, the High Priest would immerse himself five times and wash his hands and feet ten times. Except for this first immersion, he would do each on holy ground in the Parwah cell. They spread a linen sheet between him and the people. If the High Priest was either old or delicate, they warmed the water for him. He undressed, immersed himself, came up, and dried off. They brought him the golden garments; he put them on and washed his hands and feet.

They brought him the continual offering; he cut its throat, and another priest finished slaughtering it. The High Priest received the blood and sprinkled it on the altar. He entered the Sanctuary, burned the morning incense, and trimmed the lamps. Then he offered up the head, limbs, cakes, and wine-offering.

They brought him to the Parwah cell, spread a sheet of linen between him and the people, he washed his hands and feet, and undressed. (Rabbi Meir said that he undressed first and then washed his hands and feet.) Then he went down and immersed himself for the second time, came up and dried himself. They brought him white garments (as required by ). He put them on and washed his hands and feet. Rabbi Meir taught that in the morning, he wore Pelusium linen worth 12 minas, and in the afternoon he wore Indian linen worth 800 zuz. But the sages said that in the morning, he wore garments worth 18 minas, and in the afternoon he wore garments worth 12 minas. The community paid for these sums, and the High Priest could spend more from his own funds if he wanted to.

Rav Ḥisda asked why  instructed the High Priest to enter the inner precincts (the Kodesh Hakodashim) to perform the Yom Kippur service in linen vestments instead of gold. Rav Ḥisda taught that it was because the accuser may not act as defender. Gold played the accuser because it was used in the Golden Calf, and thus gold was inappropriate for the High Priest when he sought atonement and thus played the defender.

A Midrash taught that everything God created in heaven has a replica on earth. (And thus, since all that is above is also below, God dwells on earth just as God dwells in heaven.) Referring to a heavenly man,  says, "And, behold, the man clothed in linen." And of the High Priest on earth,  says, "He shall put on the holy linen tunic." And the Midrash taught that God holds the things below dearer than those above, for God left the things in heaven to descend to dwell among those below, as  reports, "And let them make Me a sanctuary, that I may dwell among them."

A Midrash taught that  alludes to the merit of the Matriarchs by mentioning linen four times.

The High Priest stood on the east with his face to the west. And he pressed both his hands on the bull and made confession, saying: "O Lord! I have done wrong, I have transgressed, I have sinned before You, I and my house. O Lord! Forgive the wrongdoings, the transgressions, and the sins that I have committed, transgressed, and sinned before You, I and my house, as it is written in the Torah of Moses Your servant (in ): "For on this day shall atonement be made for you to cleanse you; from all your sins shall you be clean before the Lord." And the people answered: "Blessed is the Name of God's glorious Kingdom, forever and ever!"

Rabbi Isaac taught that a lay Israelite could slaughter one of the two, but not the other, but Rabbi Isaac did not know which was which. The Gemara reported that Rav and Samuel disagreed about the answer. Rav held it invalid for a lay Israelite to slaughter the red cow and valid for a lay Israelite to slaughter the High Priest's bull, while Samuel held it invalid for a lay Israelite to slaughter the High Priest's bull and valid for a lay Israelite to slaughter the red cow. The Gemara reported that Rav Zeira (or some say Rav Zeira in the name of Rav) said that the slaughtering of the red cow by a lay Israelite was invalid, and Rav deduced from this statement the importance that  specifies "Eleazar" and  specifies that the law of the red cow is a "statute" (and thus required precise execution). But the Gemara asked whether the same logic might apply to the red cow, as well, as it was not a Temple service, either. The Gemara posited that one might consider the red cow to have been in the nature of an offering for Temple upkeep. The Gemara then turned to Samuel's position, that a lay Israelite could kill the red cow. And Rav explained the words "in his sight" in one place to refer to the slaughtering, and in the other to the burning, and the law enjoined his attention to both. In contrast, the Gemara posited that Eleazar might not have needed to pay close attention to the casting in of cedarwood, hyssop, and scarlet, because they were not part of the red cow itself.

A Midrash taught that God showed Abraham the bullock that  would require the Israelites to sacrifice on the Yom Kippur. Reading , “And He said to him: ‘Take me a heifer of three years old (meshuleshet), a she-goat of three years old (meshuleshet), and a ram of three years old (meshulash),’” the Midrash read , meshuleshet, to mean “three-fold” or “three kinds,” indicating sacrifices for three different purposes. The Midrash deduced that God thus showed Abraham three kinds of bullocks, three kinds of goats, and three kinds of rams that Abraham’s descendants would need to sacrifice. The three kinds of bullocks were: (1) the bullock that  would require the Israelites to sacrifice on Yom Kippur, (2) the bullock that  would require the Israelites to bring on account of unwitting transgression of the law, and (3) the heifer whose neck  would require the Israelites to break. The three kinds of goats were: (1) the goats that  would require the Israelites to sacrifice on festivals, (2) the goats that  would require the Israelites to sacrifice on the New Moon (Rosh Chodesh), and (3) the goat that  would require an individual to bring. The three kinds of rams were: (1) the guilt-offering of certain obligation that , for example, would require one who committed a trespass to bring, (2) the guilt-offering of doubt to which one would be liable when in doubt whether one had committed a transgression, and (3) the lamb to be brought by an individual. The Rabbis said that God showed Abraham the tenth of an ephah as well, for  says “all these (eleh),” just as  says, “And you shall bring the meal-offering that is made of these things (me-eleh),” and the use of “these” in both verses hints that both verses refer to the same thing. And reading , “But the bird divided he not,” the Midrash deduced that God intimated to Abraham that the bird burnt-offering would be divided, but the bird sin-offering (which the dove and young pigeon symbolized) would not be divided.

The Mishnah taught that High Priest then went back to the east of the Temple Court, north of the altar. The urn was originally made of boxwood, but Ben Gamala remade them in gold, earning him praise. Rabbi Judah explained that  mentioned the two goats equally because they should be alike in color, height, and value. The Mishnah taught that the High Priest shook the urn and brought up the two lots. On one lot was inscribed "for the Lord," and on the other "for Azazel." The Deputy High Priest stood at the High Priest's right hand and the head of the ministering family at his left. If the lot inscribed "for the Lord" came up in his right hand, the Deputy High Priest would say "Mr. High Priest, raise your right hand!" And if the lot inscribed "for the Lord" came up in his left hand, the head of the family would say "Mr. High Priest, raise your left hand!" Then he placed them on the goats and said: "A sin-offering ‘to the Lord!'" (Rabbi Ishmael taught that he did not need to say "a sin-offering" but just "to the Lord.") And then the people answered "Blessed is the Name of God's glorious Kingdom, forever and ever!"

Then the High Priest bound a thread of crimson wool on the head of the Azazel goat, and placed it at the gate from which it was to be sent away. And he placed the goat that was to be slaughtered at the slaughtering place. He came to his bull a second time, pressed his two hands on it and made confession, saying: "O Lord, I have dealt wrongfully, I have transgressed, I have sinned before You, I and my house, and the children of Aaron, Your holy people, o Lord, pray forgive the wrongdoings, the transgression, and the sins that I have committed, transgressed, and sinned before You, I and my house, and the children of Aaron, Your holy people. As it is written in the Torah of Moses, Your servant (in ): ‘For on this day atonement be made for you, to cleanse you; from all the sins shall you be clean before the Lord.'" And then the people answered: "Blessed is the Name of God's glorious Kingdom, forever and ever!" Then he killed the bull.

Rabbi Isaac had heard that one required a definite size, while the other did not, but he did not know which was which. Rav Joseph reasoned that because (as Mishnah Yoma 6:6 explains) the red thread of the scapegoat was divided, that thread required a definite size, whereas that of the red cow, which did not need to be divided, did not require a definite size. Rami bar Hama objected that the thread of the red cow required a certain weight (to be cast into the flames, as described in ). Raba said that the matter of this weight is disputed by Tannaim.

Rav Dimi reported that one weighed ten zuz, another weighed two selas, and the third weighed a shekel, but he could not say which was which. When Rabin came, he said in the name of Rabbi Jonathan that the thread in connection with the red cow weighed ten zuz, that of the scapegoat weighed two selas, and that of the person with skin disease weighed a shekel. Rabbi Johanan said that Rabbi Simeon ben Halafta and the Sages disagreed about the thread of the red cow, one saying that it weighed ten shekels, the other that it weighed one shekel. Rabbi Jeremiah of Difti said to Ravina that they disagreed not about the thread of the red cow, but about that of the scapegoat.

Reading , "My ordinances (mishpatai) shall you do, and My statutes (chukotai) shall you keep," the Sifra distinguished "ordinances" (mishpatim) from "statutes" (chukim). The term "ordinances" (mishpatim), taught the Sifra, refers to rules that even had they not been written in the Torah, it would have been entirely logical to write them, like laws pertaining to theft, sexual immorality, idolatry, blasphemy and murder. In regard to these, taught the Sifra, the Torah says simply that God legislated them and we have no right to raise doubts about them.

The Mishnah taught that the High Priest said a short prayer in the outer area. The Jerusalem Talmud taught that this was the prayer of the High Priest on the Day of Atonement, when he left the Holy Place whole and in one piece: “May it be pleasing before you, Lord, our God of our fathers, that a decree of exile not be issued against us, not this day or this year, but if a decree of exile should be issued against us, then let it be exile to a place of Torah.  May it be pleasing before you, Lord, our God and God of our fathers, that a decree of want not be issued against us, not this day or this year, but if a decree of want should be issued against us, then let it be a want because of the performance of religious duties.  May it be pleasing before you, Lord, our God and God of our fathers, that this year be a year of cheap food, full bellies, good business; a year in which the earth forms clods, then is parched so as to form scabs, and then moistened with dew, so that your people, Israel, will not be in need of the help of one another.  And do not heed the prayer of travelers that it not rain.” The Rabbis of Caesarea added, “And concerning your people, Israel, that they not exercise dominion over one another.” And for the people who live in the Sharon plain he would say this prayer, “May it be pleasing before you, Lord, our God and God of our fathers, that our houses not turn into our graves.”

The Mishnah taught that one would bring the High Priest the goat to be slaughtered, he would kill it, receive its blood in a basin, enter again the Sanctuary, and would sprinkle once upwards and seven times downwards. He would count: "one," "one and one," "one and two," and so on. Then he would go out and place the vessel on the second golden stand in the sanctuary.

Then the High Priest came to the scapegoat and laid his two hands on it, and he made confession, saying: "I beseech You, o Lord, Your people the house of Israel have failed, committed iniquity and transgressed before you. I beseech you, o Lord, atone the failures, the iniquities and the transgressions that Your people, the house of Israel, have failed, committed, and transgressed before you, as it is written in the Torah of Moses, Your servant (in ): ‘For on this day shall atonement be made for you, to cleanse you; from all your sins shall you be clean before the Lord.'" And when the Priests and the people standing in the Temple Court heard the fully pronounced Name of God come from the mouth of the High Priest, they bent their knees, bowed down, fell on their faces, and called out: "Blessed is the Name of God's glorious Kingdom, forever and ever!"

The Pirke De-Rabbi Eliezer taught that Sammael (identified with Satan) complained to God that God had given him power over all the nations of the world except for Israel. God told Sammael that he had power over Israel on the Day of Atonement if and only if they had any sin. Therefore, Israel gave Sammael a present on the Day of Atonement, as  says, "One lot for the Lord, and the other lot for Azazel" (identified with Satan or Sammael). The lot for God was the offering of a burnt offering, and the lot for Azazel was the goat as a sin offering, for all the iniquities of Israel were upon it, as  says, "And the goat shall bear upon him all their iniquities." Sammael found no sin among them on the Day of Atonement and complained to God that they were like the ministering angels in heaven. Just as the ministering angels have bare feet, so have the Israelites bare feet on the Day of Atonement. Just as the ministering angels have neither food nor drink, so the Israelites have neither food nor drink on the Day of Atonement. Just as the ministering angels have no joints, likewise the Israelites stand on their feet. Just as the ministering angels are at peace with each other, so the Israelites are at peace with each other on the Day of Atonement. Just as the ministering angels are innocent of all sin on the Day of Atonement, so are the Israelites innocent of all sin on the Day of Atonement. On that day, God hears their prayers rather than the charges of their accuser, and God makes atonement for all the people, as  says, "And he shall make atonement for the holy place."

Without good, as  says that "it is not good that the man should be alone." Without joy, as  says, "And you shall rejoice, you and your household" (implying that one can rejoice only when there is a "household" with whom to rejoice). Without a blessing, as  can be read, "To cause a blessing to rest on you for the sake of your house" (that is, for the sake of your wife). Without atonement, as  says, "And he shall make atonement for himself, and for his house" (implying that one can make complete atonement only with a household). Rabbi Simeon said in the name of Rabbi Joshua ben Levi, without peace too, as  says, "And peace be to your house." Rabbi Joshua of Siknin said in the name of Rabbi Levi, without life too, as Ecclesiastes  says, "Enjoy life with the wife whom you love." Rabbi Hiyya ben Gomdi said, also incomplete, as  says, "male and female created He them, and blessed them, and called their name Adam," that is, "man" (and thus only together are they "man"). Some say a man without a wife even impairs the Divine likeness, as  says, "For in the image of God made He man," and immediately thereafter  says, "And you, be fruitful, and multiply (implying that the former is impaired if one does not fulfill the latter).

The Mishnah taught that they handed the scapegoat over to him who was to lead it away. All were permitted to lead it away, but the Priests made it a rule not to permit an ordinary Israelite to lead it away. Rabbi Jose said that Arsela of Sepphoris once led it away, although he was not a priest. The people went with him from booth to booth, except the last one. The escorts would not go with him up to the precipice, but watched from a distance. The one leading the scapegoat divided the thread of crimson wool, and tied one half to the rock, the other half between the scapegoat horns, and pushed the scapegoat from behind. And it went rolling down and before it had reached half its way down the hill, it was dashed to pieces. He came back and sat down under the last booth until it grew dark. His garments unclean become unclean from the moment that he has gone outside the wall of Jerusalem, although Rabbi Simeon taught that they became unclean from the moment that he pushed it over the precipice.

The Sages taught that if one pushed the goat down the precipice and it did not die, then one had to go down after the goat and kill it.

The Mishnah interpreted  to teach that the goat sent to Azazel could atone for all sins, even sins punishable by death.

They would set up guards at stations, and from these would waive towels to signal that the goat had reached the wilderness. When the signal was relayed to Jerusalem, they told the High Priest: "The goat has reached the wilderness." Rabbi Ishmael taught that they had another sign too: They tied a thread of crimson to the door of the Temple, and when the goat reached the wilderness, the thread would turn white, as it is written in  "Though your sins be as scarlet, they shall be as white as snow."

These persons rendered unclean the clothes worn while doing these acts. But the red cow, the bull, and the scapegoat did not themselves render unclean clothes with which they came in contact. The Mishnah imagined the clothing saying to the person: "Those that render you unclean do not render me unclean, but you render me unclean."

But for the Ark-cover,  gave its length and breadth, but not its height. Rabbi Hanina taught that one can deduce the Ark-cover's height from the smallest of the vessel features, the border of the table, concerning which  says, "And you shall make for it a border of a handbreadth round about." Just as the height of the table's border was a handbreadth, so was it also for the Ark-cover. Rav Aha bar Jacob taught a tradition that the face of the cherubim was not less than a handbreadth, and Rav Huna also made his deduction about the Ark-cover's height from the parallel.

Rabbi Eliezer concluded that both actions had to be conducted outside the three camps of the Israelites, and in the time of the Temple in Jerusalem, both actions had to be conducted to the east of Jerusalem.

The Mishnah taught that on Yom Kippur, one must not eat, drink, wash, anoint oneself, put on sandals, or have sexual intercourse. Rabbi Eliezer (whom the halachah follows) taught that a king or bride may wash the face, and a woman after childbirth may put on sandals. But the sages forbad doing so. The Tosefta taught that one must not put on even felt shoes. But the Tosefta taught that minors can do all these things except put on sandals, for appearance's sake. The Mishnah held a person culpable to punishment for eating an amount of food equal to a large date (with its pit included), or for drinking a mouthful of liquid. For the purpose of calculating the amount consumed, one combines all amounts of food together, and all amounts liquids together, but not amounts of foods together with amounts of liquids. The Mishnah obliged one who unknowingly or forgetfully ate and drank to bring only one sin-offering. But one who unknowingly or forgetfully ate and performed labor had to bring two sin-offerings. The Mishnah did not hold one culpable who ate foods unfit to eat, or drank liquids unfit to drink (like fish-brine). The Mishnah taught that one should not afflict children at all on Yom Kippur. In the two years before they become Bar or Bat Mitzvah, one should train children to become used to religious observances (for example by fasting for several hours). The Mishnah taught that one should give food to a pregnant woman who smelled food and requested it. One should feed to a sick person at the direction of experts, and if no experts are present, one feeds a sick person who requests food. The Mishnah taught that one may even give unclean food to one seized by a ravenous hunger, until the person's eyes are opened. Rabbi Matthia ben Heresh said that one who has a sore throat may drink medicine even on the Sabbath, because it presented the possibility of danger to human life, and every danger to human life suspends the laws of the Sabbath.

Rav Ḥisda taught that the five afflictions of Yom Kippur that the Mishnah taught (eating and in drinking, bathing, smearing the body with oil, wearing shoes, and conjugal relations) are based on the five times that the Torah mentions the afflictions of Yom Kippur: (1) “And on the tenth of this seventh month you shall have a holy convocation, and you shall afflict your souls”; (2) “But on the tenth of this seventh month is the day of atonement, it shall be a holy convocation for you and you shall afflict your souls”; (3) “It shall be for you a Shabbat of solemn rest, and you shall afflict your souls; (4) “It is a Shabbat of solemn rest for you, and you shall afflict your souls”; (5) “And it shall be a statute for you forever, in the seventh month on the tenth of the month, you shall afflict your souls”.

Rabbi Akiva (or some say Rabban Johanan ben Zakai) never said in the house of study that it was time to stop studying, except on the eve of Passover and the eve of the Yom Kippur. On the eve of Passover, it was because of the children, so that they might not fall asleep, and on the eve of the Day of Atonement, it was so that they should feed their children before the fast.

Rabbi Ishmael derived this rule from what had been taught in a Baraita:  One might read , "And you shall afflict your souls on the ninth day," literally to mean that one begins fasting the entire day on the ninth day of the month;  therefore says, "in the evening." One might read "in the evening" to mean "after dark" (which the Hebrew calendar would reckon as part of the tenth day);  therefore says, "in the ninth day." The Gemara thus concluded that one begins fasting while it is still day on the ninth day, adding some time from the profane day (the ninth) to the holy day (the tenth). Because  says, "You shall rest," the Gemara applied the rule to Sabbaths as well. Because  says "your Sabbath" (your day of rest), the Gemara applied the rule to other Festivals (in addition to Yom Kippur); wherever the law creates an obligation to rest, we add time to that obligation from the surrounding profane days to the holy day. Rabbi Akiva, however, read , "And you shall afflict your souls on the ninth day," to teach the lesson learned by Rav Hiyya bar Rav from Difti (that is, Dibtha, below the Tigris, southeast of Babylon). Rav Hiyya bar Rav from Difti taught in a Baraita that  says "the ninth day" to indicate that if people eat and drink on the ninth day, then Scripture credits it to them as if they fasted on both the ninth and the tenth days (because  calls the eating and drinking on the ninth day "fasting").

The Jerusalem Talmud taught that the evil impulse (yetzer hara) craves only what is forbidden.  The Jerusalem Talmud illustrated this by relating that on the Day of Atonement, Rabbi Mana went to visit Rabbi Haggai, who was feeling weak.  Rabbi Haggai told Rabbi Mana that he was thirsty.  Rabbi Mana told Rabbi Haggai to go drink something.  Rabbi Mana left and after a while came back.  Rabbi Mana asked Rabbi Haggai what happened to his thirst.  Rabbi Haggai replied that when Rabbi Mana told him that he could drink, his thirst went away.

The Mishnah taught that death and observance of Yom Kippur with penitence atone for sin. Penitence atones for lighter sins, while for severer sins, penitence suspends God's punishment, until Yom Kippur comes to atone. The Mishnah taught that no opportunity for penance will be given to one who says: "I shall sin and repent, sin and repent." And Yom Kippur does not atone for one who says: "I shall sin and Yom Kippur will atone for me." Rabbi Eleazar ben Azariah derived from the words "From all your sins before the Lord shall you be clean" in  that Yom Kippur atones for sins against God, but Yom Kippur does not atone for transgressions between one person and another, until the one person has pacified the other. Rabbi Akiva said that Israel is fortunate, for just as waters cleanse the unclean, so does God cleanse Israel.

Rabbi Eleazer son of Rabbi Simeon taught that the Day of Atonement effects atonement even if no goat is offered. But the goat effected atonement only with the Day of Atonement.

Mar Zutra taught that the merit of a fast day lies in the charity dispensed.

The Gemara told that a poor man lived in Mar Ukba's neighborhood to whom he regularly sent 400 zuz on the eve of every Yom Kippur. Once Mar Ukba sent his son to deliver the 400 zuz. His son came back and reported that the poor man did not need Mar Ukba's help. When Mar Ukba asked his son what he had seen, his son replied that they were sprinkling aged wine before the poor man to improve the aroma in the room. Mar Ukba said that if the poor man was that delicate, then Mar Ukba would double the amount of his gift and send it back to the poor man.

Rabbi Eleazar taught that when the Temple stood, a person used to bring a shekel and so make atonement. Now that the Temple no longer stands, if people give to charity, all will be well, and if they do not, heathens will come and take from them forcibly (what they should have given away). And even so, God will reckon to them as if they had given charity, as  says, "I will make your exactors righteousness [, tzedakah]."

Rav Bibi bar Abaye taught that on the eve of the Day of Atonement, a person should confess saying: "I confess all the evil I have done before You; I stood in the way of evil; and as for all the evil I have done, I shall no more do the like; may it be Your will, O Lord my God, that You should pardon me for all my iniquities, and forgive me for all my transgressions, and grant me atonement for all my sins." Rabbi Isaac compared it to a person fitting together two boards, joining them one to another. And Rabbi Jose ben Hanina compared it to a person fitting together two bed-legs, joining them one to another. (This harmoniously does a person become joined to God when the person genuinely repents.)

The Rabbis taught that the obligation to confess sins comes on the eve of the Day of Atonement, as it grows dark. But the Sages said that one should confess before one has eaten and drunk, lest one become inebriated in the course of the meal. And even if one has confessed before eating and drinking, one should confess again after having eaten and drunk, because perhaps some wrong happened during the meal. And even if one has confessed during the evening prayer, one should confess again during the morning prayer. And even if one has confessed during the morning prayer, one should do so again during the Musaf additional prayer. And even if one has confessed during the Musaf, one should do so again during the afternoon prayer. And even if one has done so in the afternoon prayer, one should confess again in the Ne'ilah concluding prayer. The Gemara taught that the individual should say the confession after the (silent recitation of the) Amidah prayer, and the public reader says it in the middle of the Amidah. Rav taught that the confession begins: "You know the secrets of eternity . . . ." Samuel, however, taught that the confession begins: "From the depths of the heart . . . ." Levi said: "And in Your Torah it is said, [‘For on this day He shall make atonement for you.']" (.) Rabbi Johanan taught that the confession begins: "Lord of the Universe, . . . ." Rav Judah said: "Our iniquities are too many to count, and our sins too numerous to be counted." Rav Hamnuna said: "My God, before I was formed, I was of no worth, and now that I have been formed, it is as if I had not been formed. I am dust in my life, how much more in my death. Behold, I am before You like a vessel full of shame and reproach. May it be Your will that I sin no more, and what I have sinned wipe away in Your mercy, but not through suffering." That was the confession of sins used by Rav all the year round, and by Rav Hamnuna the younger, on the Day of Atonement. Mar Zutra taught that one should say such prayers only if one has not already said, "Truly, we have sinned," but if one has said, "Truly, we have sinned," no more is necessary. For Bar Hamdudi taught that once he stood before Samuel, who was sitting, and when the public reader said, "Truly, we have sinned," Samuel rose, and so Bar Hamdudi inferred that this was the main confession.

Resh Lakish taught that great is repentance, for because of it, Heaven accounts premeditated sins as errors, as  says, "Return, O Israel, to the Lord, your God, for you have stumbled in your iniquity." "Iniquity" refers to premeditated sins, and yet Hosea calls them "stumbling," implying that Heaven considers those who repent of intentional sins as if they acted accidentally.  But the Gemara said that that is not all, for Resh Lakish also said that repentance is so great that with it, Heaven accounts premeditated sins as though they were merits, as  says, "And when the wicked turns from his wickedness, and does that which is lawful and right, he shall live thereby." The Gemara reconciled the two positions, clarifying that in the sight of Heaven, repentance derived from love transforms intentional sins to merits, while repentance out of fear transforms intentional sins to unwitting transgressions.

Reading Song of Songs , Rabbi Joshua ben Levi compared Israel to a nut-tree.  Rabbi Azariah taught that just as when a nut falls into the dirt, you can wash it, restore it to its former condition, and make it fit for eating, so however much Israel may be defiled with iniquities all the rest of the year, when the Day of Atonement comes, it makes atonement for them, as  says, "For on this day shall atonement be made for you, to cleanse you."

The Mishnah taught that Divine judgment is passed on the world at four seasons (based on the world's actions in the preceding year) — at Passover for produce; at Shavuot for fruit; at Rosh Hashanah all creatures pass before God like children of maron (one by one), as  says, "He Who fashions the heart of them all, Who considers all their doings." And on Sukkot, judgment is passed in regard to rain. Rabbi Meir taught that all are judged on Rosh Hashanah and the decree is sealed on Yom Kippur. Rabbi Judah, however, taught that all are judged on Rosh Hashanah and the decree of each and every one of them is sealed in its own time — at Passover for grain, at Shavuot for fruits of the orchard, at Sukkot for water. And the decree of humankind is sealed on Yom Kippur. Rabbi Jose taught that humankind is judged every single day, as  says, "What is man, that You should magnify him, and that You should set Your heart upon him, and that You should remember him every morning, and try him every moment?"

Rav Kruspedai said in the name of Rabbi Johanan that on Rosh Hashanah, three books are opened in Heaven — one for the thoroughly wicked, one for the thoroughly righteous, and one for those in between. The thoroughly righteous are immediately inscribed definitively in the book of life. The thoroughly wicked are immediately inscribed definitively in the book of death. And the fate of those in between is suspended from Rosh Hashanah to Yom Kippur. If they deserve well, then they are inscribed in the book of life; if they do not deserve well, then they are inscribed in the book of death. Rabbi Abin said that  tells us this when it says, "Let them be blotted out of the book of the living, and not be written with the righteous." "Let them be blotted out from the book" refers to the book of the wicked. "Of the living" refers to the book of the righteous. "And not be written with the righteous" refers to the book of those in between. "Blot me, I pray" refers to the book of the wicked. "Out of Your book" refers to the book of the righteous. "That you have written" refers to the book of those in between. It was taught in a Baraita that the House of Shammai said that there will be three groups at the Day of Judgment — one of thoroughly righteous, one of thoroughly wicked, and one of those in between. The thoroughly righteous will immediately be inscribed definitively as entitled to everlasting life; the thoroughly wicked will immediately be inscribed definitively as doomed to Gehinnom, as  says, "And many of them who sleep in the dust of the earth shall awake, some to everlasting life and some to reproaches and everlasting abhorrence." Those in between will go down to Gehinnom and scream and rise again, as  says, "And I will bring the third part through the fire, and will refine them as silver is refined, and will try them as gold is tried. They shall call on My name and I will answer them."

Rav Mana of Sha'ab (in Galilee) and Rav Joshua of Siknin in the name of Rav Levi compared repentance at the High Holidays to the case of a province that owed arrears on its taxes to the king, and the king came to collect the debt. When the king was within ten miles, the nobility of the province came out and praised him, so he freed the province of a third of its debt. When he was within five miles, the middle-class people of the province came out and praised him, so he freed the province of another third of its debt. When he entered the province, all the people of the province — men, women, and children — came out and praised him, so he freed them of all of their debt. The king told them to let bygones be bygones; from then on they would start a new account. In a similar manner, on the eve of Rosh Hashanah, the leaders of the generation fast, and God absolves them of a third of their iniquities. From Rosh Hashanah to Yom Kippur, private individuals fast, and God absolves them of a third of their iniquities. On Yom Kippur, everyone fasts — men, women and children — and God tells Israel to let bygones be bygones; from then onwards we begin a new account. From Yom Kippur to Sukkot, all Israel are busy with the performance of religious duties. One is busy with a sukkah, one with a lulav. On the first day of Sukkot, all Israel stand in the presence of God with their palm-branches and etrogs in honor of God's name, and God tells them to let bygones be bygones; from now we begin a new account. Rabbi Aha explained that the words, "For with You there is forgiveness," in signify that forgiveness waits with God from Rosh Hashanah onward. And forgiveness waits that long so (in the words of ) "that You may be feared" and God may impose God's awe upon God's creatures (through the suspense and uncertainty).

Rabban Simeon ben Gamaliel said that there never were greater days of joy in Israel than the 15th of Av and Yom Kippur. On those days, the daughters of Jerusalem would come out in borrowed white garments, dance in the vineyards, and exclaim to the young men to lift up their eyes and choose for themselves.

Seven days shall the son that is priest in his stead put them on." This text demonstrated that a priest who had put on the required larger number of garments and who had been anointed on each of the seven days was permitted to serve as High Priest. , however, says, "And the priest who shall be anointed and who shall be consecrated to be priest in his father's stead shall make the atonement." The Baraita interpreted the words, "Who shall be anointed and who shall be consecrated," to mean one who had been anointed and consecrated in whatever way (as long as he had been consecrated, even if some detail of the ceremony had been omitted). The Baraita thus concluded that if the priest had put on the larger number of garments for only one day and had been anointed on each of the seven days, or if he had been anointed for only one day and had put on the larger number of garments for seven days, he would also be permitted to perform the Yom Kippur service.

The Jerusalem Talmud reported that Rav Idi in the name of Rabbi Isaac taught that  includes the words, “As the Lord commanded him,” to teach that the High Priest was required to read  as part of the Yom Kippur service.

The Jerusalem Talmud reported that Jews wear white on the High Holy Days.  Rabbi Hama the son of Rabbi Hanina and Rabbi Hoshaiah disagreed about how to interpret , “And what great nation is there, that has statutes and ordinances so righteous as all this law.” One said: “And what great nation is there?” Ordinarily those who know they are on trial wear black, wrap themselves in black, and let their beards grow, since they do not know how their trial will turn out.  But that is not how it is with Israel.  Rather, on the day of their trial, they wear white, wrap themselves in white, and shave their beards and eat, drink, and rejoice, for they know that God does miracles for them.

Leviticus chapter 17
Rabbi Berekiah said in the name of Rabbi Isaac that in the Time to Come, God will make a banquet for God's righteous servants, and whoever had not eaten meat from an animal that died other than through ritual slaughtering (neveilah, prohibited by ) in this world will have the privilege of enjoying it in the World to Come. (By one's present self-restraint one might merit to partake of the banquet in the Hereafter.)

A Midrash interpreted , "The Lord lets loose the prisoners," to read, "The Lord permits the forbidden," and thus to teach that what God forbade in one case, God permitted in another. God forbade the abdominal fat of cattle (in ), but permitted it in the case of beasts. God forbade consuming the sciatic nerve in animals (in ) but permitted it in fowl. God forbade eating meat without ritual slaughter (in ) but permitted it for fish. Similarly, Rabbi Abba and Rabbi Jonathan in the name of Rabbi Levi taught that God permitted more things than God forbade.

A Tanna taught that the prohibition of the high places stated in  took place on the first of Nisan. The Tanna taught that the first of Nisan took ten crowns of distinction by virtue of the ten momentous events that occurred on that day. Rav Assi of Hozna'ah deduced from the words, "And it came to pass in the first month of the second year, on the first day of the month," in  that the Tabernacle was erected on the first of Nisan.

Leviticus chapter 18

 calls on the Israelites to obey God's "statutes" (chukim) and "ordinances" (mishpatim). The Rabbis in a Baraita taught that the "ordinances" (mishpatim) were commandments that logic would have dictated that we follow even had Scripture not commanded them, like the laws concerning idolatry, adultery, bloodshed, robbery, and blasphemy.

So one should separate from transgression and accept the rule of Heaven.

The Gemara cited  for the proposition that, except for a very few circumstances, a person need not obey God's commandments if doing so would cause the person to die. With regard to idolatry, the Gemara asked whether one could commit it to save one's life, as it was taught in a Baraita that Rabbi Ishmael said that if a person is directed to engage in idolatry in order to avoid being killed, the person should do so, and stay alive. From this, one might think that a person could openly engage in idolatry in order to avoid being killed, but this is not so, as  teaches, "Neither shall you profane My holy Name; but I will be hallowed." When Rav Dimi came from the Land of Israel to Babylonia, he taught that the rule that one may violate any commandment except idolatry, prohibited sexual relations, and murder to stay alive applied only when there is no royal decree forbidding the practice of Judaism. But Rav Dimi taught that if there is such a decree, one must incur martyrdom rather than transgress even a minor precept. When Ravin came, he said in Rabbi Johanan's name that even absent such a decree, one was allowed to violate a commandment to stay alive only in private; but in public one needed to be martyred rather than violate even a minor precept. Rava bar Rav Isaac said in Rav's name that in this context one should choose martyrdom rather than violate a commandment even to change a shoe strap. Rabbi Jacob said in Rabbi Johanan's name that the minimum number of people for an act to be considered public is ten. And the Gemara taught that ten Jews are required for the event to be public, for  says, "I will be hallowed among the children of Israel."

Rabbi Levi taught that the punishment for false weights or measures (discussed at ) was more severe than that for having intimate relations with forbidden relatives (discussed at ). For in discussing the case of forbidden relatives,  uses the Hebrew word , eil, for the word "these," whereas in the case of false weights or measures,  uses the Hebrew word , eileh, for the word "these" (and the additional , eh at the end of the word implies additional punishment.) The Gemara explained that the punishments for giving false measures are greater than those for having relations with forbidden relatives because for forbidden relatives, repentance is possible (as long as there have not been children), but with false measure, repentance is impossible (as one cannot remedy the sin of robbery by mere repentance; the return of the things robbed must precede it, and in the case of false measures, it is practically impossible to find out all the members of the public who have been defrauded).

The Gemara interpreted  to prohibit a man from lying with his father's wife, whether or not she was his mother, and whether or not the father was still alive.

The Mishnah taught that , in prohibiting "a woman and her daughter," prohibited a man’s daughter, his daughter's daughter, his son's daughter, his wife's daughter, her daughter's daughter, his mother-in-law, the mother of his mother-in-law, and the mother of his father-in-law.

Rav Awira taught (sometimes in the name of Rabbi Ammi, sometimes in the name of Rabbi Assi) that the words "And the child grew, and was weaned (va-yigamal), and Abraham made a great feast on the day that Isaac was weaned" in  teach that God will make a great feast for the righteous on the day that God manifests (yigmol) God's love to Isaac's descendants. After they have eaten and drunk, they will ask Abraham to recite the Grace after meals (Birkat Hamazon), but Abraham will answer that he cannot say Grace, because he fathered Ishmael. Then they will ask Isaac to say Grace, but Isaac will answer that he cannot say Grace, because he fathered Esau. Then they will ask Moses, but Moses will answer that he cannot, because God did not allow him to enter the Land of Israel either in life or in death. Then they will ask Joshua, but Joshua will answer that he cannot, because he was not privileged to have a son, for  reports, "Nun was his son, Joshua was his son," without listing further descendants. Then they will ask David, and he will say Grace, and find it fitting for him to do so, because  records David saying, "I will lift up the cup of salvation, and call upon the name of the Lord."

A Baraita was taught in the Academy of Eliyahu: A certain scholar diligently studied Bible and Mishnah, and greatly served scholars, but nonetheless died young. His wife carried his tefillin to the synagogues and schoolhouses and asked if  says, "for that is your life, and the length of your days," why her husband nonetheless died young. No one could answer her. On one occasion, Eliyahu asked her how he was to her during her days of white garments — the seven days after her menstrual period — and she reported that they ate, drank, and slept together without clothing. Eliyahu explained that God must have slain him because he did not sufficiently respect the separation that  requires.

In medieval Jewish interpretation
The parashah is discussed in these medieval Jewish sources: 

Leviticus chapter 16
Maimonides noted that the scapegoat that was sent into the wilderness in  served as an atonement for all serious transgressions more than any other sin-offering of the congregation. Maimonides explained that as it thus seemed to carry off all sins, the scapegoat was not accepted as an ordinary sacrifice to be slaughtered, burned, or even brought near the Sanctuary. Rather, it was removed as far as possible from the community. Maimonides wrote that there is no doubt that sins cannot actually be carried like a burden, and taken off the shoulder of one being to be laid on that of another being. But the ceremonies of the scapegoat were symbolic, and serve to impress upon people the need to repent, as if to say, we have freed ourselves of our previous deeds, have cast them behind us, and removed them as far as possible.

Maimonides taught that the object of the Fast of Atonement is the sense of repentance that it creates.  Maimonides noted that it was on Yom Kippur that Moses came down from Mount Sinai with the second tablets and announced to the Israelites God’s pardon of their sin with the Golden Calf.  God therefore appointed Yom Kippur forever as a day devoted to repentance and the true worship of God.  For this reason, the law interdicts all material enjoyment, trouble and care for the body, and work, so that people might spend the day confessing their sins and abandoning them.

Leviticus chapter 17
Maimonides reported that the Sabians and other non-Jews hoped that by eating blood, they would gain the company and goodwill of the spirits, who might then tell them about the future. Maimonides explained that  sought to cure humanity of such afflictions. And Maimonides similarly explained that  required that whenever Israelites killed a beast or bird that could be eaten, its blood had to be covered with earth, so that people would not assemble around the blood for the purpose of eating in the presence of spirits.

In modern interpretation
The parashah is discussed in these modern sources:

Leviticus chapter 16
Professor Jacob Milgrom, formerly of the University of California, Berkeley, taught that the evidence of the ethical impulse in the sacrificial system attained its zenith in Yom Kippur. Milgrom wrote that what originally was only a rite to purge the sanctuary was expanded to include a rite to purge the people. To begin with, Milgrom taught, the pagan notion of demonic impurity was eviscerated by insisting that the accumulated pollution of the sanctuary was caused by human sin. Then, Milgrom taught, "a more radical alteration" was introduced with the scapegoat, which initially eliminated the sanctuary's impurities, but then became the vehicle for purging their source — the human heart — provided that the people purged themselves through rites of penitence. Thus Milgrom taught that what was originally a purgation rite of the Temple was broadened and transformed into an annual day for the collective catharsis of Israel whereby God would continue to reside with Israel because God's Temple and people had once again been purified.

Professor James Kugel of Bar Ilan University reported that according to one theory, the Priestly source (often abbreviated P) invented Nadab and Abihu, giving them the names of the discredited King Jeroboam’s sons, so that they could die in the newly-inaugurated sanctuary (as noted in ) and thereby defile it through corpse contamination, so that God could then instruct Aaron in  about how to purify the sanctuary through Yom Kippur. This theory posited that the Israelites had originally used Yom Kippur’s purification procedure any time it was needed during the year, and thus it made sense to the narrative to have the sanctuary contaminated (in ) and then immediately purged (in ), but eventually, when the Israelites made sanctuary purgation an annual rite, the Priestly source inserted  to list other potential sources of impurity that might require the sanctuary to be purged.

Leviticus chapter 17

Noting that , 21 permits nonsacrificial slaughter, Milgrom argued that Deuteronomy thus overturned the Priestly law of  that all meat for human consumption had to have been offered on the altar. Milgrom cited this as support for why Leviticus must be older than Deuteronomy.

Kugel reported that the Israeli archaeologist Israel Finkelstein found no pig bones in hilltop sites starting in the Iron I period (roughly 1200–1000 BCE) and continuing through Iron II, while before that, in Bronze Age sites, pig bones abounded. Kugel deduced from Finkelstein’s data that the new hilltop residents were fundamentally different from both their predecessors in the highlands and the city Canaanites — either because they were a different ethnic group, or because they had adopted a different way of life, for ideological or other reasons. Kugel inferred from Finkelstein’s findings that these highlanders shared some ideology (if only a food taboo), like modern-day Jews and Muslims.

Leviticus chapter 18

From Orthodox Judaism, in 2010, four leaders of the Rabbi Isaac Elchanan Theological Seminary of Yeshiva University posted a statement saying that the Torah absolutely prohibits homosexual behavior, and with respect to homosexuality, the study of Torah will place observant Jews at odds with political correctness and the temper of the times, but they must be honest with themselves and with God, regardless of the consequences. In 2006, the Committee on Jewish Law and Standards of Conservative Judaism approved by a 13-to-12 vote a responsum that held that while the explicit biblical ban on anal sex between men remains in effect, for homosexuals who are incapable of maintaining a heterosexual relationship, the rabbinic prohibitions that have been associated with other gay and lesbian intimate acts are superseded based upon the Talmudic principle of the obligation to preserve the human dignity of all people, in effect normalizing the status of gay and lesbian Jews in the Jewish community, while explicitly not ruling on the question of gay marriage. In 1977, the Central Conference of American Rabbis of Reform Judaism adopted a resolution encouraging legislation to decriminalize homosexual acts between consenting adults and prohibit discrimination against them. And in 2013, the Central Conference of American Rabbis Responsa Committee adopted a responsum holding that Reform rabbis officiate with the full support of the CCAR at the marriage ceremonies of Jews of the same sex and Reform rabbis may consider these same-sex marriages to be kiddushin, utilizing in the marriage ceremony the Jewish forms and rites that are most appropriate to the partners involved.

Commandments
According to Sefer ha-Chinuch, there are 2 positive and 26 negative commandments in the parashah:
A Kohen must not enter the Temple in Jerusalem indiscriminately.
To follow the procedure of Yom Kippur
Not to slaughter sacrifices outside the courtyard
To cover the blood of a slaughtered beast or fowl with earth
Not to make pleasurable sexual contact with any forbidden woman
Not to have homosexual sexual relations with one's father
Not to have sexual relations with one's mother
Not to have sexual relations with one's father's wife
Not to have sexual relations with one's sister
Not to have sexual relations with one's son's daughter
Not to have sexual relations with one's daughter's daughter
Not to have sexual relations with one's daughter
Not to have sexual relations with one's father's wife's daughter
Not to have sexual relations with one's father's sister
Not to have sexual relations with one's mother's sister
Not to have homosexual sexual relations with one's father's brother
Not to have sexual relations with one's father's brother's wife
Not to have sexual relations with one's son's wife
Not to have sexual relations with one's brother's wife
Not to have sexual relations with a woman and her daughter
Not to have sexual relations with a woman and her son's daughter
Not to have sexual relations with a woman and her daughter's daughter
Not to have sexual relations with one's wife's sister while both are alive
Not to have sexual relations with a menstrually impure woman
Not to pass one's children through the fire to Molech
Not to have male homosexual sexual relations
A man must not have sexual relations with a beast.
A woman must not have sexual relations with a beast.

The Weekly Maqam
In the Weekly Maqam, Sephardi Jews each week base the songs of the services on the content of that week's parashah. For parashah Acharei, Sephardi Jews apply Maqam Hijaz, the maqam that expresses mourning and sadness, because the parashah alludes to the deaths of Nadab and Abihu, the first two sons of Aaron.

Haftarah
The haftarah for the parashah is:
for Ashkenazi Jews: 
for Sephardi Jews: 

Connection to the parashah
Both the parashah and the haftarah address prohibited sexual practices.

On Shabbat Machar Chodesh

On Shabbat HaGadol

Connection to the special Sabbath
Shabbat HaGadol means "the Great Sabbath," and the haftarah for the special Sabbath refers to a great day that God is preparing.

Parashah Acharei Mot-Kedoshim
When parashah Acharei Mot is combined with parashah Kedoshim (as it is in 2021, 2023, 2025, 2026, and 2028), the haftarah is the haftarah for parashah Kedoshim:
for Ashkenazi Jews: 
for Sephardi Jews: 

See also
Azazel in rabbinic literature
Conservative Judaism and sexual orientation
Homosexuality and Judaism
Leviticus 18
Same-sex marriage and Judaism

Notes

Further reading
The parashah has parallels or is discussed in these sources:

Ancient
"Temple Program for the New Year's Festival at Babylon." Babylonia. In Ancient Near Eastern Texts Relating to the Old Testament. Edited by James B. Pritchard, pages 331–34. Princeton, New Jersey: Princeton University Press, 1969.

Biblical
, 49–53 (riddance ritual);  (Molech);  (Yom Kippur).
 (passing children through the fire).
1 Kings , 33 (Molech).
 (son pass through fire);  (children pass through fire);  (son pass through fire);  (Molech).
 (Molech or king).
 (child sacrifice);  (Molech);  (Molech or Malcam).
 (sacrificing children);  (the just man avoids contact with the menstruating woman);  (sacrifice of sons).
 (Molech or king).
 (Molech).
 (God's imputing iniquity to a person);  (cleansing from sin);  (holiness in God's house);  (God's forgiveness);  (sacrifice to demons).
 (children pass through fire).

Early nonrabbinic
Philo. Allegorical Interpretation 2:14:52, 15:56; That the Worse Is Wont To Attack the Better 22:80; On the Posterity of Cain and His Exile 20:70; On the Giants 8:32; Who Is the Heir of Divine Things? 16:84; On Mating with the Preliminary Studies 16:85–87; On Flight and Finding 28:159; 34:193; On Dreams, That They Are God-Sent 2:28:189, 34:231; The Special Laws 4:23:122. Alexandria, Egypt, early 1st Century CE. In, e.g., The Works of Philo: Complete and Unabridged, New Updated Edition. Translated by Charles Duke Yonge, pages 43, 121, 138, 154, 283, 311, 335, 338, 401, 404, 628. Peabody, Massachusetts: Hendrickson Publishers, 1993.
Hebrews . Circa 63–100. (Yom Kippur).
Josephus, Antiquities of the Jews 3:10:3, 11:2, 12:1. Circa 93–94. In, e.g., The Works of Josephus: Complete and Unabridged, New Updated Edition. Translated by William Whiston, page 95. Peabody, Massachusetts: Hendrickson Publishers, 1987.
Acts  (Molech).

Classical rabbinic
Mishnah: Bikkurim 2:9; Shabbat 6:10; Shekalim 4:2; Yoma 1:1–8:9; Beitzah 1:1–5:7; Rosh Hashanah 1:2; Taanit 4:8; Megillah 3:5; 4:9; Chagigah 2:1; Yevamot 2:3; Sotah 7:7; Sanhedrin 7:4, 7; 9:1; Makkot 3:15; Shevuot 1:4–7; Zevachim 12:5; 14:1–2, 9; Menachot 9:7; Keritot 1:1; 2:4; 5:1; Parah 1:4; 8:3. Land of Israel, circa 200 CE Reprinted in, e.g., The Mishnah: A New Translation. Translated by Jacob Neusner, pages 171, 256, 265–79, 291–300, 321, 323, 330, 339, 459, 597, 602, 619, 621–22, 726, 729, 731, 752, 836, 839, 845–46, 1014, 1025. New Haven, Connecticut: Yale University Press, 1988.
Sifra 174:1–194:3. Land of Israel, 4th Century. In, e.g., Sifra: An Analytical Translation. Translated by Jacob Neusner, volume 3, pages 1–84. Atlanta: Scholars Press, 1988.
Jerusalem Talmud: Kilayim 76a; Maaser Sheni 12a; Shabbat 5b, 10b, 55b–56a, 69b, 94a; Pesachim 32a, 58a; Shekalim 24b; Yoma 1a–57a; Sukkah 3b, 27a; Beitzah 1a–49b; Taanit 27a, 28b; Megillah 17b, 39b; Yevamot 1b–2a, 10b–11a, 20a, 50a, 61a–62a; Ketubot 19b, 38b; Nedarim 9b; Nazir 27a; Sotah 23b; Kiddushin 1b, 11a; Sanhedrin 20b, 22b, 39a, 40a–b, 42a–b, 43b–44b, 46a, 47a, 48a, 49a, 55b–57a, 61b; Makkot 11a; Shevuot 5a–b, 6b, 8a, 9a, 10a, 16b, 17b, 21a, 23b; Avodah Zarah 10a, 21a; Horayot 6a, 7b, 8b, 15a, 16b. Tiberias, Land of Israel, circa 400 CE. In, e.g., Talmud Yerushalmi. Edited by Chaim Malinowitz, Yisroel Simcha Schorr, and Mordechai Marcus, volumes 5, 10, 13–15, 18–23, 25–26, 29–31, 33, 35–36, 40, 44–49. Brooklyn: Mesorah Publications, 2008–2020. And in, e.g., The Jerusalem Talmud: A Translation and Commentary. Edited by Jacob Neusner and translated by Jacob Neusner, Tzvee Zahavy, B. Barry Levy, and Edward Goldman. Peabody, Massachusetts: Hendrickson Publishers, 2009.
Genesis Rabbah 2:3; 3:8; 17:2; 31:6; 65:14–15; 98:1. Land of Israel, 5th century. In, e.g., Midrash Rabbah: Genesis. Translated by Harry Freedman and Maurice Simon, volume 1, pages 16–17, 24, 132–33, 241; volume 2, pages 590–91, 945. London: Soncino Press, 1939.
Mekhilta of Rabbi Simeon 9:5; 37:2; 47:1; 48:2; 54:1; 60:4; 69:3; 74:5. Land of Israel, 5th Century. In, e.g., Mekhilta de-Rabbi Shimon bar Yohai. Translated by W. David Nelson, pages 29, 163, 205, 215, 243, 275, 317, 348. Philadelphia: Jewish Publication Society, 2006.
Leviticus Rabbah 3:3; 5:6; 13:3; 17:3; 20:1–23:13; 24:6; 27:9; 30:7. Land of Israel, 5th Century. In, e.g., Midrash Rabbah: Leviticus. Translated by Harry Freedman and Maurice Simon, volume 4, pages 37, 71, 166–68, 216, 250–303, 308, 354, 389–90. London: Soncino Press, 1939. 

Babylonian Talmud: Berakhot 6b Shabbat 13a–b, 22a, 67a, 86a; Eruvin 63a; Pesachim 22a, 26a, 47b, 65a, 75b, 77a, 79a, 85b; Yoma 2a–88a; Sukkah 5a, 24a, 28a, 33a; Beitzah 2a, 7a–8a; Rosh Hashanah 26a; Megillah 7b, 20b, 24a, 25a, 30b–31a; Moed Katan 9a, 15b, 28a; Chagigah 9a, 10a, 11b, 16a, 23b; Yevamot 2a, 3a–b, 5b–8b, 11a, 13a, 17b, 19a, 21a–23a, 28b, 33b, 49a, 50a, 54b–55b, 56b, 83b, 97a, 102b, 114a; Ketubot 29a, 30a, 32b–33a, 36a, 47b, 56a, 67b, 72a, 82b; Nedarim 51a, 78a; Sotah 4b, 16a, 17a, 26b, 40b–41a; Gittin 54b, 60a; Kiddushin 13b–14a, 22b, 43a, 44b, 50b–51a, 57b, 67b–68a; Bava Kamma 32a, 38a, 40b–41a, 76a, 91b, 96b; Bava Batra 25a, 88b, 109b, 120a–21a; Sanhedrin 12b, 18a, 19b, 28b, 33b, 34b, 42b, 43b, 49b, 51a, 52b, 53b–55a, 57b, 58b–59a, 60b–61a, 74a, 75b–76a, 81a, 82a; Makkot 5b, 13a–14b, 18a, 23a–24a; Shevuot 2a–b, 7b–8b,  12a–14a, 17b–18b; Avodah Zarah 3a, 11a, 17a–b, 27b, 47a, 51a–b, 54a, 74a; Horayot 6a, 8b, 13a; Zevachim 6a, 19b, 26a–b, 35a, 40a, 46a, 52a, 57a, 69a–70a, 78a, 81a, 83a, 84b, 98a, 104a, 105a–09b, 112a–b, 113b, 116b, 118a, 119b; Menachot 8b, 12b, 16a, 22a, 26a, 27a–b, 83a, 91b–92a, 93b; Chullin 10b–11a, 16b–17a, 20b, 22a, 24a, 27b, 29b, 31a, 41b, 72a, 78a, 79b, 83b–84a, 85a, 86b–87a, 88a, 98b, 117a, 120a, 131b, 138a–39a; Bekhorot 39b, 56b; Temurah 2b, 5b, 6b, 12a, 13a, 14a, 29b; Keritot 2a–3b, 4b, 5a, 6a–b, 9a, 10b, 14a–15a, 20b–21a, 22a, 25b, 28a; Meilah 11a–b, 13b; Niddah 35a, 55a–b. Sasanian Empire, 6th Century. In, e.g., Talmud Bavli. Edited by Yisroel Simcha Schorr, Chaim Malinowitz, and Mordechai Marcus, 72 volumes. Brooklyn: Mesorah Publications, 2006.

Medieval
Rashi. Commentary. Leviticus 16–18. Troyes, France, late 11th Century. In, e.g., Rashi. The Torah: With Rashi's Commentary Translated, Annotated, and Elucidated. Translated and annotated by Yisrael Isser Zvi Herczeg, volume 3, pages 191–223. Brooklyn: Mesorah Publications, 1994. .
Rashbam. Commentary on the Torah. Troyes, early 12th century. In, e.g., Rashbam's Commentary on Leviticus and Numbers: An Annotated Translation. Edited and translated by Martin I. Lockshin, pages 87–96. Providence, Rhode Island: Brown Judaic Studies, 2001. .
Judah Halevi. Kuzari. 3:53. Toledo, Spain, 1130–1140. In, e.g., Jehuda Halevi. Kuzari: An Argument for the Faith of Israel. Introduction by Henry Slonimsky, page 181. New York: Schocken Books, 1964. .
Numbers Rabbah 2:23; 5:4, 7; 7:8; 9:10, 15; 10:8; 13:15–16; 14:1, 12; 15:24; 16:23; 17:5; 18:21; 19:5. 12th century. In, e.g., Midrash Rabbah: Numbers. Translated by Judah J. Slotki, volume 5, pages 59, 147, 151, 196, 256, 269, 375–76; volume 6, pages 536, 564, 622, 671, 691, 705, 739, 755–56. London: Soncino Press, 1939. .
Abraham ibn Ezra. Commentary on the Torah. Mid-12th century. In, e.g., Ibn Ezra's Commentary on the Pentateuch: Leviticus (Va-yikra). Translated and annotated by H. Norman Strickman and Arthur M. Silver, volume 3, pages 121–52. New York: Menorah Publishing Company, 2004. .
Maimonides. Mishneh Torah, Introduction 25; Structure; Hilchot Teshuvah (The Laws of Repentance), chapter 1, halachot 2–3. Cairo, Egypt, 1170–1180. In, e.g., Mishneh Torah: Hilchot Teshuvah: The Laws of Repentance. Translated by Eliyahu Touger, volume 4, pages 8–15. New York: Moznaim Publishing, 1990.  .

Maimonides. The Guide for the Perplexed, part 3, chapters 37, 41, 46, 47, 48, 49. Cairo, Egypt, 1190. In, e.g., Moses Maimonides. The Guide for the Perplexed. Translated by Michael Friedländer, pages 334, 346, 362–64, 366, 369, 371, 376–77. New York: Dover Publications, 1956. .
Hezekiah ben Manoah. Hizkuni. France, circa 1240. In, e.g., Chizkiyahu ben Manoach. Chizkuni: Torah Commentary. Translated and annotated by Eliyahu Munk, volume 3, pages 745–61. Jerusalem: Ktav Publishers, 2013. .
Nachmanides. Commentary on the Torah. Jerusalem, circa 1270. In, e.g., Ramban (Nachmanides): Commentary on the Torah. Translated by Charles B. Chavel, volume 3, pages 210–80. New York: Shilo Publishing House, 1974. .

Zohar. Part 3, pages 56a–80a. Spain, late 13th Century.
Bahya ben Asher. Commentary on the Torah. Spain, early 14th century. In, e.g., Midrash Rabbeinu Bachya: Torah Commentary by Rabbi Bachya ben Asher. Translated and annotated by Eliyahu Munk, volume 5, pages 1674–728. Jerusalem: Lambda Publishers, 2003. . 
Jacob ben Asher (Baal Ha-Turim). Rimze Ba'al ha-Turim. Early 14th century. In, e.g., Baal Haturim Chumash: Vayikra/Leviticus. Translated by Eliyahu Touger, edited, elucidated, and annotated by Avie Gold, volume 3, pages 1163–89. Brooklyn: Mesorah Publications, 2000. .
Jacob ben Asher. Perush Al ha-Torah. Early 14th century. In, e.g., Yaakov ben Asher. Tur on the Torah. Translated and annotated by Eliyahu Munk, volume 3, pages 877–9. Jerusalem: Lambda Publishers, 2005. .
Isaac ben Moses Arama. Akedat Yizhak (The Binding of Isaac). Late 15th century. In, e.g., Yitzchak Arama. Akeydat Yitzchak: Commentary of Rabbi Yitzchak Arama on the Torah. Translated and condensed by Eliyahu Munk, volume 2, pages 591–611. New York, Lambda Publishers, 2001. .
Isaac Abravanel. Commentary on the Torah. Italy, between 1492–1509. In, e.g., Abarbanel: Selected Commentaries on the Torah: Volume 3: Vayikra/Leviticus. Translated and annotated by Israel Lazar, pages 136–63. Brooklyn: CreateSpace, 2015. . And excerpted in, e.g., The Abarbanel on the Yom Kippur Service in the Beis Hamikdash. Translated by Elimelech Lepon. Southfield, Michigan: Targum Press, 1990. .

Modern

Obadiah ben Jacob Sforno. Commentary on the Torah. Venice, 1567. In, e.g., Sforno: Commentary on the Torah. Translation and explanatory notes by Raphael Pelcovitz, pages 562–77. Brooklyn: Mesorah Publications, 1997. .
Moshe Alshich. Commentary on the Torah. Safed, circa 1593. In, e.g., Moshe Alshich. Midrash of Rabbi Moshe Alshich on the Torah. Translated and annotated by Eliyahu Munk, volume 2, pages 679–98. New York, Lambda Publishers, 2000. .
Menasseh ben Israel. El Conciliador (The Conciliator). Amsterdam, 1632. In The Conciliator of R. Manasseh Ben Israel: A Reconcilement of the Apparent Contradictions in Holy Scripture: To Which Are Added Explanatory Notes, and Biographical Notices of the Quoted Authorities. Translated by Elias Hiam Lindo, pages 226–29. London, 1842. Reprinted by, e.g., Nabu Press, 2010. .

Thomas Hobbes. Leviathan, 3:40, 41. England, 1651. Reprint edited by C. B. Macpherson, pages 503–04, 513–14. Harmondsworth, England: Penguin Classics, 1982. .
Avraham Yehoshua Heschel. Commentaries on the Torah. Cracow, Poland, mid 17th century. Compiled as Chanukat HaTorah. Edited by Chanoch Henoch Erzohn. Piotrkow, Poland, 1900. In Avraham Yehoshua Heschel. Chanukas HaTorah: Mystical Insights of Rav Avraham Yehoshua Heschel on Chumash. Translated by Avraham Peretz Friedman, pages 227–29. Southfield, Michigan: Targum Press/Feldheim Publishers, 2004. .
Shabbethai Bass. Sifsei Chachamim. Amsterdam, 1680. In, e.g., Sefer Vayikro: From the Five Books of the Torah: Chumash: Targum Okelos: Rashi: Sifsei Chachamim: Yalkut: Haftaros, translated by Avrohom Y. Davis, pages 298–350. Lakewood Township, New Jersey: Metsudah Publications, 2012.
Chaim ibn Attar. Ohr ha-Chaim. Venice, 1742. In Chayim ben Attar. Or Hachayim: Commentary on the Torah. Translated by Eliyahu Munk, volume 3, pages 1127–90. Brooklyn: Lambda Publishers, 1999. .
Yitzchak Magriso. Me'am Lo'ez. Constantinople, 1753. In Yitzchak Magriso. The Torah Anthology: MeAm Lo'ez. Translated by Aryeh Kaplan, volume 11, pages 329–419. New York: Moznaim Publishing, 1989. .

Nachman of Breslov. Teachings. Bratslav, Ukraine, before 1811. In Rebbe Nachman's Torah: Breslov Insights into the Weekly Torah Reading: Exodus-Leviticus. Compiled by Chaim Kramer, edited by Y. Hall, pages 346–63. Jerusalem: Breslov Research Institute, 2011. .
Samuel David Luzzatto (Shadal). Commentary on the Torah. Padua, 1871. In, e.g., Samuel David Luzzatto. Torah Commentary. Translated and annotated by Eliyahu Munk, volume 3, pages 949–62. New York: Lambda Publishers, 2012. .

Yehudah Aryeh Leib Alter. Sefat Emet. Góra Kalwaria (Ger), Poland, before 1906. Excerpted in The Language of Truth: The Torah Commentary of Sefat Emet. Translated and interpreted by Arthur Green, pages 179–83, 351–56. Philadelphia: Jewish Publication Society, 1998. . Reprinted 2012. .
Hermann Cohen. Religion of Reason: Out of the Sources of Judaism. Translated with an introduction by Simon Kaplan; introductory essays by Leo Strauss, pages 127, 222, 416. New York: Ungar, 1972. Reprinted Atlanta: Scholars Press, 1995. . Originally published as Religion der Vernunft aus den Quellen des Judentums. Leipzig: Gustav Fock, 1919.

Sigmund Freud. “The Savage’s Dread of Incest.” In Totem and Taboo: Resemblances Between the Psychic Lives of Savages and Neurotics. Translated by A.A. Brill. New York: Moffat, Yard and Company, 1919. Originally published as Totem und Tabu: Einige Übereinstimmungen im Seelenleben der Wilden und der Neurotiker. Leipzig, 1913.
Fritz Lang. Metropolis. Babelsberg: Universum Film A.G., 1927. (early science fiction film with Molech plot element).
Alexander Alan Steinbach. Sabbath Queen: Fifty-four Bible Talks to the Young Based on Each Portion of the Pentateuch, pages 90–93. New York: Behrman's Jewish Book House, 1936.

Thomas Mann. Joseph and His Brothers. Translated by John E. Woods, pages 79, 82–83, 147–48, 152–53, 189, 201–02, 226–27, 336, 351, 384–86, 927. New York: Alfred A. Knopf, 2005. . Originally published as Joseph und seine Brüder. Stockholm: Bermann-Fischer Verlag, 1943.
James A. Michener. The Source, pages 106–20. New York: Random House, 1965.
Electric Prunes. "Kol Nidre." In Release of an Oath. Reprise Records, 1968. (track based on the Yom Kippur Kol Nidre prayer).
Seymour E. Freedman. The Book of Kashruth: A Treasury of Kosher Facts and Frauds. Bloch Publishing Company, 1970. .
Central Conference of American Rabbis. "Rights of Homosexuals." (1977).
Gordon J. Wenham. The Book of Leviticus, pages 225–61. Grand Rapids, Michigan: William B. Eerdmans Publishing Company, 1979. .
Pinchas H. Peli. Torah Today: A Renewed Encounter with Scripture, pages 133–36. Washington, D.C.: B'nai B'rith Books, 1987. .
David P. Wright. The Disposal of Impurity, pages 15–74. Atlanta: Scholars Press, 1987. .
Yehuda Amichai. Yom Kippur. In The Fist, Too, Was Once the Palm of an Open Hand, and Fingers. Israel, 1989. In, e.g., The Selected Poetry of Yehuda Amichai. Translated by Chana Bloch and Stephen Mitchell, pages 177–78. Oakland, California: University of California Press, 2013.
Mark S. Smith. The Early History of God: Yahweh and the Other Deities in Ancient Israel, pages 2, 132–33. New York: HarperSanFrancisco, 1990. .
Harvey J. Fields. A Torah Commentary for Our Times: Volume II: Exodus and Leviticus, pages 127–37. New York: UAHC Press, 1991. .
Leah Rosenthal. “Inui Nefesh (Self-Affliction) on Yom Kippur: A Literary and Conceptual Analysis of a Talmudic Discussion.” In Torah of the Mothers: Contemporary Jewish Women Read Classical Jewish Texts. Edited by Ora Wiskind Elper and Susan Handelman, pages 338–54. New York and Jerusalem: Urim Publications, 2000.
"Consensus Statement on Homosexuality." New York: Rabbinical Assembly, 1992. EH 24.1992a. In Responsa: 1991–2000: The Committee on Jewish Law and Standards of the Conservative Movement. Edited by Kassel Abelson and David J. Fine, page 612. New York: Rabbinical Assembly, 2002. .
Joel Roth. "Homosexuality." New York: Rabbinical Assembly, 1992. EH 24.1992b. In Responsa: 1991–2000: The Committee on Jewish Law and Standards of the Conservative Movement. Edited by Kassel Abelson and David J. Fine, pages 613–75. New York: Rabbinical Assembly, 2002. .
Howard Handler. "In the Image of God: A Dissent in Favor of the Full Equality of Gay and Lesbian Jews into the Community of Conservative Judaism." New York: Rabbinical Assembly, 1992. EH 24.1992h. In Responsa: 1991–2000: The Committee on Jewish Law and Standards of the Conservative Movement. Edited by Kassel Abelson and David J. Fine, pages 718–21. New York: Rabbinical Assembly, 2002. .
Aaron Wildavsky. Assimilation versus Separation: Joseph the Administrator and the Politics of Religion in Biblical Israel, pages 3–4. New Brunswick, New Jersey: Transaction Publishers, 1993. .
Jacob Milgrom. "Does the Bible Prohibit Homosexuality? The biblical prohibition is addressed only to Israel. It is incorrect to apply it on a universal scale." Bible Review, volume 9 (number 6) (December 1993).
Victor Avigdor Hurowitz. "Review Essay: Ancient Israelite Cult in History, Tradition, and Interpretation." AJS Review, volume 19 (number 2) (1994): pages 213–36.
Walter C. Kaiser Jr., " The Book of Leviticus," in The New Interpreter's Bible, volume 1, pages 1107–28. Nashville: Abingdon Press, 1994. .
Jacob Milgrom. "How Not to Read the Bible: I am not for homosexuality, but I am for homosexuals. When the Bible is distorted to make God their enemy I must speak out to set the record straight." Bible Review, volume 10 (number 2) (April 1994).
Judith S. Antonelli. "Sexuality." In In the Image of God: A Feminist Commentary on the Torah, pages 288–302. Northvale, New Jersey: Jason Aronson, 1995. .
Ellen Frankel. The Five Books of Miriam: A Woman's Commentary on the Torah, pages 172–78. New York: G. P. Putnam's Sons, 1996. .

W. Gunther Plaut. The Haftarah Commentary, pages 285–91. New York: UAHC Press, 1996. .
Calum M. Carmichael. Law, Legend, and Incest in the Bible: Leviticus 18–20, pages 1–61, 189–98. Ithaca: Cornell University Press, 1997. .
Robert Goodman. “Yom Kippur.” In Teaching Jewish Holidays: History, Values, and Activities, pages 39–61. Denver: A.R.E. Publishing, 1997. .
Sorel Goldberg Loeb and Barbara Binder Kadden. Teaching Torah: A Treasury of Insights and Activities, pages 194–200. Denver: A.R.E. Publishing, 1997. .
Jacob Milgrom. "The Blood Taboo: Blood should not be ingested because it contains life. Whoever does so is guilty of murder." Bible Review, volume 13 (number 4) (August 1997).
Jacob Milgrom. Leviticus 1–16, volume 3, pages 1009–84. New York: Anchor Bible, 1998. .
Mary Douglas. Leviticus as Literature, pages 10, 33, 37, 62, 72, 76, 79, 90–92, 123, 131, 137, 140, 151, 187, 191–94, 225–26, 228, 231–40, 247–51. Oxford: Oxford University Press, 1999. .
Frank H. Gorman Jr. "Leviticus." In The HarperCollins Bible Commentary. Edited by James L. Mays, pages 158–60. New York: HarperCollins Publishers, revised edition, 2000. .
Jacob Milgrom. Leviticus 17–22, volume 3A, pages 1447–593. New York: Anchor Bible, 2000. .
Susan Ackerman. "When the Bible Enters the Fray: As Vermont legalizes civil unions for same-sex couples, both sides of the debate turn to the Bible for support. They might do better to turn to Bible scholars, too." Bible Review. Volume 16 (number 5) (October 2000): pages 6, 50.
Dayle A. Friedman. "After a Death . . . Then What?" In The Women's Torah Commentary: New Insights from Women Rabbis on the 54 Weekly Torah Portions. Edited by Elyse Goldstein, pages 218–24. Woodstock, Vermont: Jewish Lights Publishing, 2000. .
Lainie Blum Cogan and Judy Weiss. Teaching Haftarah: Background, Insights, and Strategies, pages 444–50. Denver: A.R.E. Publishing, 2002. .
Michael Fishbane. The JPS Bible Commentary: Haftarot, pages 178–92. Philadelphia: Jewish Publication Society, 2002. .
Gershon Hepner. “Abraham's Incestuous Marriage with Sarah a Violation of the Holiness Code.” Vetus Testamentum, volume 53 (number 2) (April 2003): pages 143–55.
Robert Alter. The Five Books of Moses: A Translation with Commentary, pages 611–24. New York: W.W. Norton & Co., 2004. .
William K. Gilders. Blood Ritual in the Hebrew Bible: Meaning and Power. Baltimore: Johns Hopkins University Press, 2004. . (close reading of ).
Ilana Berenbaum Grinblat. "Haftarah for Yom Kippur Morning: Isaiah 57:14–59:4." In The Women's Haftarah Commentary: New Insights from Women Rabbis on the 54 Weekly Haftarah Portions, the 5 Megillot & Special Shabbatot. Edited by Elyse Goldstein, pages 308–11. Woodstock, Vermont: Jewish Lights Publishing, 2004. .
Nina H. Mandel. "Haftarat Acharei Mot: Ezekiel 22:1–19." In The Women's Haftarah Commentary: New Insights from Women Rabbis on the 54 Weekly Haftarah Portions, the 5 Megillot & Special Shabbatot. Edited by Elyse Goldstein, pages 134–37.
Jacob Milgrom. Leviticus: A Book of Ritual and Ethics: A Continental Commentary, pages 162–211. Minneapolis: Fortress Press, 2004. .
Baruch J. Schwartz. "Leviticus." In The Jewish Study Bible. Edited by Adele Berlin and Marc Zvi Brettler, pages 243–52. New York: Oxford University Press, 2004. .
Antony Cothey. “Ethics and Holiness in the Theology of Leviticus.” Journal for the Study of the Old Testament, volume 30 (number 2) (December 2005): pages 131–51.Professors on the Parashah: Studies on the Weekly Torah Reading Edited by Leib Moscovitz, pages 184–203. Jerusalem: Urim Publications, 2005. .
Bernard J. Bamberger. "Leviticus." In The Torah: A Modern Commentary: Revised Edition. Edited by W. Gunther Plaut; revised edition edited by David E.S. Stern, pages 769–96. New York: Union for Reform Judaism, 2006. .
Calum Carmichael. Illuminating Leviticus: A Study of Its Laws and Institutions in the Light of Biblical Narratives. Baltimore: Johns Hopkins University Press, 2006. .
Joel Roth. "Homosexuality Revisited." EH 24.2006a New York: Rabbinical Assembly, 2006.
Elliot N. Dorff, Daniel S. Nevins, and Avram I. Reisner. "Homosexuality, Human Dignity & Halakhah: A Combined Responsum for the Committee on Jewish Law And Standards." EH 24.2006b New York: Rabbinical Assembly, 2006.
Leonard Levy. "Same-Sex Attraction and Halakhah." EH 24.2006c New York: Rabbinical Assembly, 2006.
Baruch Frydman-Kohl. "You Have Wrestled with God and Human and Prevailed: Homosexuality and Halakhah." EH 24.2006d New York: Rabbinical Assembly, 2006.
Loel M. Weiss. "Same-Sex Attraction and Halakhah: A Concurring Opinion." EH 24.2006e New York: Rabbinical Assembly, 2006.
Myron Geller, Robert Fine and David Fine. "A New Context: The Halakhah of Same-Sex Relations." EH 24.2006f New York: Rabbinical Assembly, 2006.
Gordon Tucker. "Halakhic and Metahalakhic Arguments Concerning Judaism and Homosexuality." EH 24.2006g New York: Rabbinical Assembly, 2006.
Suzanne A. Brody. "Blood Is Life." In Dancing in the White Spaces: The Yearly Torah Cycle and More Poems, page 90. Shelbyville, Kentucky: Wasteland Press, 2007. .
David C. Kraemer. Jewish Eating and Identity Through the Ages. New York: Routledge, 2007. .
James L. Kugel. How To Read the Bible: A Guide to Scripture, Then and Now, pages 131, 275, 291, 302–03, 321, 326–28, 609–10, 647. New York: Free Press, 2007. .
Jennifer K. Berenson MacLean. "Barabbas, the Scapegoat Ritual, and the Development of the Passion Narrative." Harvard Theological Review. Volume 100 (number 3) (July 2007): pages 309–34.
Christophe Nihan. From Priestly Torah to Pentateuch: A Study in the Composition of the Book of Leviticus. Coronet Books, 2007. .
Kenton L. Sparks. “‘Enūma Elish’ and Priestly Mimesis: Elite Emulation in Nascent Judaism.” Journal of Biblical Literature, volume 126 (2007): 632–35. (“Priestly Mimesis in the Day of Atonement Rite (Leviticus 16)”).
Preston Sprinkle. “Law and Life: Leviticus 18.5 in the Literary Framework of Ezekiel.” Journal for the Study of the Old Testament, volume 31 (number 3) (March 1, 2007): pages 275–93.
James W. Watts. Ritual and Rhetoric in Leviticus: From Sacrifice to Scripture. New York: Cambridge University Press, 2007. .
Howard Cooper. "Some Thoughts on 'Scapegoating' and Its Origins in Leviticus 16." European Judaism: A Journal for the New Europe, volume 41 (number 2) (Autumn 2008): pages 112–19.The Torah: A Women's Commentary. Edited by Tamara Cohn Eskenazi and Andrea L. Weiss, pages 679–700. New York: URJ Press, 2008. .
Nathan MacDonald. What Did the Ancient Israelites Eat? Diet in Biblical Times. Cambridge: William B. Eerdmans Publishing Company, 2008. .
Roland Boer. “The Forgetfulness of Julia Kristeva: Psychoanalysis, Marxism and the Taboo of the Mother.” Journal for the Study of the Old Testament, volume 33 (number 3) (March 2009): pages 259–76.
Elliot N. Dorff. “How Flexible Can Jewish Law Be? Parashat Acharei Mot (Leviticus 16:1–18:30).” In Torah Queeries: Weekly Commentaries on the Hebrew Bible. Edited by Gregg Drinkwater, Joshua Lesser, and David Shneer; foreword by Judith Plaskow, pages 151–56. New York: New York University Press, 2009. .
Roy E. Gane. "Leviticus." In Zondervan Illustrated Bible Backgrounds Commentary. Edited by John H. Walton, volume 1, pages 304–11. Grand Rapids, Michigan: Zondervan, 2009. .
Jeff Friedman. Yom Kippur. In The American Poetry Review, volume 38 (number 3) (May/June 2009), page 32.
Reuven Hammer. Entering Torah: Prefaces to the Weekly Torah Portion, pages 169–71. New York: Gefen Publishing House, 2009. .
Meir Malul. "אִישׁ עִתִּי (Leviticus 16:21): A Marginal Person." Journal of Biblical Literature, volume 128 (number 3) (Fall 2009): pages 437–42.
Union for Reform Judaism. “Eating Jewishly.” New York, 2009. (resolution adopted by the URJ).
Noach Dzmura. Balancing on the Mechitza: Transgender in Jewish Community. Berkeley, California: North Atlantic Books, 2010. .
Mark Leuchter. “The Politics of Ritual Rhetoric: A Proposed Sociopolitical Context for the Redaction of Leviticus 1–16.” Vetus Testamentum, volume 60 (number 3) (2010): pages 345–65.
Yitzhaq Feder. “On kuppuru, kippēr and Etymological Sins that Cannot be Wiped Away.” Vetus Testamentum, volume 60 (number 4) (2010): pages 535–45.
Stuart Lasine. “Everything Belongs to Me: Holiness, Danger, and Divine Kingship in the Post-Genesis World.” Journal for the Study of the Old Testament, volume 35 (number 1) (September 2010): pages 31–62.
Andrew Ramer, Camille Shira Angel, Dev Noily, and Jay Michaelson. Queering the Text: Biblical, Medieval, and Modern Jewish Stories. Maple Shade, New Jersey: White Crane Books, 2010. .
Hershel Schachter, Mordechai Willig, Michael Rosensweig, and Mayer Twersky. "Torah View on Homosexuality" (2010).
"Reporters' Roundtable: Sex and Sexuality Edition." The Forward. (July 31, 2010). (podcast on Orthodox Judaism's attempts to address homosexuality).
Gal Beckerman. "Debate Over Homosexuality Now Roiling Orthodox Jews: Some Rabbis Reach Out to Gays, While Others Attempt a ‘Cure.'" The Forward. (August 6, 2010).
Lawrence Rifkin. "The Times They Are A-Changin': Jewish Religious Attitudes Toward Homosexuality Are Slowly Shifting." The Jerusalem Report. Volume 21 (number 11) (September 13, 2010): pages 10–13.
Jeffrey Stackert. "Leviticus." In The New Oxford Annotated Bible: New Revised Standard Version with the Apocrypha: An Ecumenical Study Bible. Edited by Michael D. Coogan, Marc Z. Brettler, Carol A. Newsom, and Pheme Perkins, pages 166–70. New York: Oxford University Press, Revised 4th Edition 2010. .
Mark Washofsky. "Orthodox Minyan in a Reform Synagogue." In Reform Responsa for the Twenty-First Century, volume 1, pages 3, 6 note 7, 11–12 note 7. New York: Central Conference of American Rabbis, 2010. . (application of a difference between the House of Hillel and the House of Shammai with regard to forbidden sexual unions in the law of Levirite marriage to an Orthodox Jew's request to conduct a minyan without women in a Reform synagogue).All These Vows: Kol Nidre. Edited by Lawrence A. Hoffman. Woodstock, Vermont: Jewish Lights Publishing, 2011. .
Brad Embry. “The ‘Naked Narrative’ from Noah to Leviticus: Reassessing Voyeurism in the Account of Noah’s Nakedness in Genesis 9.22–24.” Journal for the Study of the Old Testament, volume 35 (number 4) (June 2011): pages 417–33..
Jonathan Haidt. The Righteous Mind: Why Good People Are Divided by Politics and Religion, pages 13, 103, 325 note 22, 337 note 16. New York: Pantheon, 2012. . (kashrut).

Shmuel Herzfeld. "The Cycles of Yom Kippur." In Fifty-Four Pick Up: Fifteen-Minute Inspirational Torah Lessons, pages 164–68. Jerusalem: Gefen Publishing House, 2012. .
CCAR Responsa Committee. "Same-Sex Marriage as Kiddushin." 5774.4. (2013).
Tracy M. Lemos. “Where There Is Dirt, Is There System? Revisiting Biblical Purity Constructions.” Journal for the Study of the Old Testament, volume 37 (number 3) (March 2013): pages 265–94.
Amiel Ungar. "Gay Marriage and the Jewish Question: A conscious decision not to produce Jewish descendants is lamentable and means that liberal Judaism will have fewer stakeholders in the future." The Jerusalem Report, volume 24 (number 5) (June 17, 2013): page 22.
Adam Nagourney. "Gay Marriage Stirs Rebellion at Synagogue." The New York Times. (July 6, 2013): page A1.
Shmuel Klitsner. "The Cloud, the Mist, the Thicket: Moments of doubt and unanswered questions foster spiritual search." The Jerusalem Report. Volume 24 (number 12) (September 23, 2013): page 44.
Eve Levavi Feinstein. “Leviticus 18 and Sexual Pollution of Men.” In Sexual Pollution in the Hebrew Bible, pages 100–31. New York: Oxford University Press, 2014.
Sam Schulman. "Same-Sex Marriage and the Jews." Mosaic Magazine. (February 2014).
Shmuel Herzfeld. Food for the Spirit: Inspirational Lessons from the Yom Kippur Service. Jerusalem: Gefen Publishing House, 2014. .

Jonathan Sacks. Covenant & Conversation: A Weekly Reading of the Jewish Bible: Leviticus: The Book of Holiness, pages 239–79. Jerusalem: Maggid Books, 2015. .
Jonathan Sacks. Lessons in Leadership: A Weekly Reading of the Jewish Bible, pages 153–56. New Milford, Connecticut: Maggid Books, 2015. .
David Booth, Ashira Konigsburg, and Baruch Frydman-Kohl. “Modesty Inside and Out: A Contemporary Guide to Tzniut,” page 7. New York: Rabbinical Assembly, 2016. ( and modesty in dress).
Jonathan Sacks. Essays on Ethics: A Weekly Reading of the Jewish Bible, pages 183–87. New Milford, Connecticut: Maggid Books, 2016. .
Shai Held. The Heart of Torah, Volume 2: Essays on the Weekly Torah Portion: Leviticus, Numbers, and Deuteronomy, pages 52–60. Philadelphia: Jewish Publication Society, 2017. .
Steven Levy and Sarah Levy. The JPS Rashi Discussion Torah Commentary, pages 93–96. Philadelphia: Jewish Publication Society, 2017. .
Leonard A. Sharzer. “Transgender Jews and Halakhah.” New York: Rabbinical Assembly, 2017.
Idan Dershowitz. “The Secret History of Leviticus.” The New York Times, July 21, 2018. ( and ).
Maxine Grossman. “Queerly Sectarian: Jewish Difference, the Dead Sea Scrolls, and Marital Disciplines.” Journal of Jewish Identities, volume 11 (number 1) (2018): page 93.
Laura Reiley. “Doctrine and Diet: Shalt Thou Eat an Impossible Burger?” The Washington Post. September 12, 2019, pages A1, A18.
Julia Rhyder. "Sabbath and Sanctuary Cult in the Holiness Legislation: A Reassessment." Journal of Biblical Literature'', volume 138, number 4 (2019): pages 721–40.

External links

Texts
Masoretic text and 1917 JPS translation
Hear the parashah chanted 
Hear the parashah read in Hebrew

Commentaries

Academy for Jewish Religion, California
Academy for Jewish Religion, New York
Aish.com 
Akhlah: The Jewish Children's Learning Network
Aleph Beta Academy
American Jewish University — Ziegler School of Rabbinic Studies
Anshe Emes Synagogue, Los Angeles 
Ari Goldwag
Ascent of Safed
Bar-Ilan University
Chabad.org
eparsha.com
G-dcast
The Israel Koschitzky Virtual Beit Midrash
Jewish Theological Seminary
Mechon Hadar
MyJewishLearning.com
Ohr Sameach
ON Scripture — The Torah
Orthodox Union
OzTorah, Torah from Australia
Oz Ve Shalom — Netivot Shalom
Pardes from Jerusalem
Professor James L. Kugel
Professor Michael Carasik
Rabbi Dov Linzer
Rabbi Fabian Werbin
Rabbi Jonathan Sacks
RabbiShimon.com 
Rabbi Shlomo Riskin
Rabbi Shmuel Herzfeld
Rabbi Stan Levin
Reconstructionist Judaism 
Sephardic Institute
Shiur.com
613.org Jewish Torah Audio
Tanach Study Center
TheTorah.com
Teach613.org, Torah Education at Cherry Hill
Torah from Dixie 
Torah.org
TorahVort.com
Union for Reform Judaism
United Synagogue of Conservative Judaism
What's Bothering Rashi?
Yeshivat Chovevei Torah
Yeshiva University

Weekly Torah readings in Nisan
Weekly Torah readings in Iyar
Yom Kippur
Weekly Torah readings from Leviticus